The World Saxophone Quartet is an American jazz ensemble founded in 1977, incorporating elements of free jazz, R&B, funk and South African jazz into their music.

The original members were Julius Hemphill (alto and soprano saxophone, flute), Oliver Lake (alto and soprano saxophone), Hamiet Bluiett (baritone saxophone, alto clarinet), and David Murray (tenor saxophone, bass clarinet). The first three had worked together as members of the Black Artists' Group in St. Louis, Missouri, and had appeared together on Anthony Braxton's album New York, Fall 1974. In 1991, Hemphill left the group due to illness, and was replaced by Arthur Blythe, although several saxophonists have filled his chair in the years since.  Hemphill died on April 2, 1995. Beginning in the early 1980s, the quartet used Bluiett's composition "Hattie Wall" (released on W.S.Q., Live in Zurich, Dances and Ballads, Steppenwolf and Yes We Can) as a signature theme for the group. The group principally recorded and performed as a saxophone quartet, usually with a line-up of two altos, tenor, and baritone (reflecting the composition of a classical string quartet), but were also joined later in their career by drummers, bassists, and other musicians. Occasionally other saxophonists would sit in or substitute for a tour. These guests have included Sam Rivers, Tony Kofi, Steve Potts, Branford Marsalis, James Spaulding and Jorge Sylvester. Hamiet Bluiett died on October 4, 2018, after an extended illness. The ensemble had split up in 2016.

Discography

Albums

References

External links
Review of 2009's Yes We Can

1977 establishments in the United States
2016 disestablishments in the United States
Free jazz ensembles
Post-bop ensembles
Saxophone quartets
American jazz ensembles
Avant-garde jazz ensembles
Justin Time Records artists
Musical groups established in 1977
Musical groups disestablished in 2016